Leroy ("Roy," "Everready") Roberts (June 21, 1894 - January 1, 1964) was a pitcher in baseball's Negro leagues from 1916 to 1934. He played for several teams, but was mostly associated with the Bacharach Giants.  In 1921 he spent a season as the ace pitcher of the Columbus Buckeyes, leading the Negro National League in innings pitched and several other categories while compiling a 7-15 record.  His primary pitch was the fastball.

References

The Negro Leagues Book edited by Dick Clark & Larry Lester {1994} Publisher: The Society for American Baseball Research (Cleveland OH) 
The Biographical Encyclopedia of the Negro Baseball Leagues  by James A. Riley {1994} Publisher: Carroll & Graf (New York NY)

External links
 and Baseball-Reference Black Baseball stats and Seamheads

Bacharach Giants players
Brooklyn Royal Giants players
Cleveland Red Sox players
Columbus Buckeyes (Negro leagues) players
1894 births
1964 deaths
20th-century African-American sportspeople